Cliburn is a surname in the English language. The name originated as a habitational name (from Cliburn, Cumbria, England).

This place name is derived from the two Old English elements: the first, clif, meaning "slope" or "bank"; the second, burna, meaning "stream". A variant of the surname is Clibburn. Early records of the name include de Clebern, in 1364; and Clibburn, in 1475. In some cases the surname Claiborne may also be a variant of Cliburn, however, the surname is generally found in Norfolk, and other areas in the south-east. Claiborne, like Cliburn, is a habitational name, although it is derived from two Old English elements meaning (first) "clay" and (second) "spring" or "stream".

People with the name
 Van Cliburn (1934–2013), American pianist
 Stan Cliburn (born 1956), American retired professional baseball player
 Stew Cliburn (born 1956), American retired professional baseball player

References

English-language surnames
English toponymic surnames